Eupithecia isotenes is a moth in the family Geometridae first described by Louis Beethoven Prout in 1932. It is found in Ethiopia and Kenya.

References

Moths described in 1932
isotenes
Moths of Africa